New Fryston is a small former coal mining village in Castleford, West Yorkshire, England, located in a river bend on the south bank of the River Aire.

The colliery opened in the 1870s in the grounds of the now-demolished Fryston Hall and was named Fryston, and the village was built in the 1880s to house some of the miners. At its peak, the pit employed around 1,300 miners. It closed in 1985. After the pit's closure, the colliery buildings were demolished.

The settlement is also called Fryston village. 

In 2005, a re-generation programme called the Castleford Project, carried out a number of re-developments in Fryston including what turned out to be a controversial new Village Green; these re-developments were the subject of a series of television programmes on Channel 4.

See also
List of Yorkshire Pits
Richard Monckton Milnes, 1st Baron Houghton

References

External links

Villages in West Yorkshire
Castleford
Mining communities in England